David Brickhill-Jones (born 19 January 1981) is a British orienteer. He was on the British Orienteering Federation's Senior squad in 2008. His best performance was at a 2005 World Cup sprint race, where he achieved a silver medal. At the European Orienteering Championships in 2002 he came fourth in the Sprint race. He reached a career-high ranking of 30th place on the International Orienteering Federation rankings. He is currently part of the British Orienteering squad, which is run by the British Orienteering Federation.  He runs for Halden SK in Norway and Interlopers in the UK.

References

External links
 
 
 

1981 births
Living people
British orienteers
Male orienteers
Foot orienteers
Competitors at the 2009 World Games